Lisa Emerson is a New Zealand academic and as of 2019 is a full professor and director of teaching and learning at Massey University.

Academic career 

Emerson graduated with an MA (1988) and a PhD (2000) from Massey University. She joined the staff of Massey in 1989, being appointed associate professor in 2010 and the promoted to full professor from 1 January 2019.

In 2008 Emerson received the New Zealand Prime Minister's Supreme Award for Teaching Excellence. Iain Hay included her teaching method in his 2011 book, Inspiring Academics. She was awarded a Fulbright Scholarship in 2013. She was appointed a principal fellow of the Higher Education Academy in May 2019.

Selected works

References

External links 

 
 
 

Living people
Year of birth missing (living people)
New Zealand women academics
Principal Fellows of the Higher Education Academy
Massey University alumni
Academic staff of the Massey University